In a Forest, Dark and Deep is a play by Neil LaBute. It received its world premiere production in the West End's Vaudeville Theatre on 14 March 2011 following previews from 3 March 2011, running for a limited season until 4 June 2011. The production starred Matthew Fox and Olivia Williams.

The play had its American premiere at Profiles Theatre in Chicago, Illinois in April 2012 through 3 June.
The production stars Darrell W. Cox and Natasha Lowe and was directed by Joe Jahraus. The Chicago Tribune reviewer wrote:"Interesting and formatively atypical, it strikes me as very much a meditation on what is and is not true, on the ease of rushing to misjudgment, and also a further manifestation of the longstanding authorial fascination with the close link between deep intimacy and dark violence."

This production was followed by a Contemporary American Theater Festival (Shepherdstown, West Virginia) production as part of the 2012 Festival from 6 to 29 July 2012.

References

Plays by Neil LaBute
2011 plays
West End plays
Two-handers